The 2017 British Athletics Championships was the national championship in outdoor track and field for athletes in the United Kingdom, held from 1–2 July 2017 at Alexander Stadium in Birmingham. It was organised by UK Athletics. A full range of outdoor events were held up to 5000 metres. The competition served as the main selection event for the 2017 World Championships in Athletics.

Results

Men

Women

References 
 Results. UK Athletics (2017-07-01). Retrieved 2019-04-20.

External links
British Athletics

British Athletics Championships
British Outdoor Championships
Athletics Outdoor
Athletics Championships
Sports competitions in Birmingham, West Midlands